Rev. N. Samuel of Tranquebar (Tamil: ஞா.சாமுவேல்; 18 September 1850 – 20 May 1927) was a professor in divinity, pastor in the Tamil Evangelical Lutheran Church (T.E.L.C.), and a hymnodist. He was a famous poet and author of many books. He was also the first member of the Leipzig Evangelical Lutheran Mission (L.E.L.M.) Council.

Timeline
Born at Kumbakonam on 18 September 1850
Trained by R. Handmann, Tranquebar Seminary 1877–1880 & 1892–1901
Ordained on 31 October 1878 at Tranquebar, by senior J. M. N. Schwartz
Pastor at Tranquebar 1880–1891 & 1897–1919
Pastor at Karaikal 1897–1919
Pastor at Manikramam 1919
Pastor at Porayar 1917–1919
Pastor at Bangalore 1921
With Missouri Mission 1921–1927
Returned to T.E.L.C. Early 1927
Died in Madras on 20 May 1927

Professor
He was the first Indian professor in the Theological Colleges in Tranquebar, Porayar, and Bangalore (United Theological College). He was slated to teach some classes in the Gurukul Lutheran Theological College in Chennai, when he died.

Poet
Best known among his lyrics are "En Meetpar Uyirodirukayilay" (என் மீட்பர் உயிரோடிருக்கயிலே), "Senaigalin Kartharey" (சேனைகளின் கர்த்தரே), "Seerthiri Yegavasthey" (சீர்திரி ஏகவஸ்தே நமோ நமோ), and "Gunapadu Paavi" (குணப்படு பாவி). He composed the college song "Arulaar Putkarathil Thangi" and designed the monogram, for the Gurukul Lutheran Theological College.

Vedanayagam Sastriar of Tanjore, Krishnapillai of Palyamkottai, and N. Samuel of Tranquebar were known as the triumvirate of Tamil Christian poets.

One of his earliest compositions was about a journey to Tanjore called "Thanjai Payan Padham". Another was "Kallu Kummi" (The Toddy Kummi), where the strong drink talks about her glories, which made the drunkard blush in shame. His book Gospel Lyrics contains 200 songs composed over a period of 60 years.

He is remembered as a translator who put German hymns into Tamil meter, including the following:
 Gott sei Dank in aller Welt, "Kartharukku Sthothiram" (கர்த்தருக்கு ஸ்தோத்திரம்)
 , "Erathangaayam Kuth-thum" (இரத்தம் காயம் குத்தும்)
 Nun freut euch, Gottes Kinder all, "Magizh Karthaavin Manthayae" (மகிழ் கர்த்தாவின் மந்தையே)
 , "Aa Yesuvae, Neer Yengalai" (ஆ ஏசுவே, நீர் எங்களை)
 , "Naal Pome, Yen Saavu Velai" (எந்த நாள் போம், ஏன் சாவு வேளை)
 Laudamus te, "Ummai Thuthikirome" (உம்மை துதிக்கிறோமே)
 Du, o schönes Weltgebäude, "Veghuperuku-inbamaana" (வெகுபேருக்கு இன்பமான)

Author
Rev. N. Samuel wrote several books on Lutheran history, theology, and practical Christian living. He also wrote for children. He wrote in both Tamil and German, and also translated several books from German to Tamil.

Among the books authored by him are:
 Thoopa Kalasam, Censer of Incense
 Thiru tiru virunthadi, Pocket Communion Book
 Ullathu Narpathu
 Pushpa Kodai
 Companion to the Village Preacher
 Life of Ziegenbalg
 Tranquebar Mission History
 Village Sermons Vol I Suvisesha Vaakiya Prasanga Puthagam, sermonic works on the Gospels
 Village Sermons Vol II Niruba Vaakiya Prasanga Puthagam, sermonic works on the Epistles
 Plain Talk of a Plain Christian
 The Pocket Prayer Book
 Martin Luther Sasthriyaar Viviya Sarithira Surukkam
 Yerusalem Nagar Alivu
 Yezhu Siru Vaarthaigal
 Christian Proverbs and Maxims--Naru Malarkothu
 Tharangai Mission Sarithiram (Styled after Fenger's History of the Tranquebar Mission)
 Orusandhinaal Dhyaanam, meditations for Lent with 40 meditations
 Ullathu Solvane

For theological students, he wrote:
 Samayosidha Vedha Vaakiya Kuripu, concordance
 Sathiya Vedhabayiram, an introduction to the Bible
 Thiruchabai Varusha Vivaram, Outlines of Church History

For children, he wrote:
 Children's storybook, Paalar Poocharam
 Moral tales, Kadhaa Malar Koodai, Basket of Flowers
 Children's prayer book

For parents, he wrote:
 Petror Ozhukkam

His translations:
 Mey Manasthaabam kanneer, translation of Heinrich Muller's Tears of Repentance, a booklet that is a good preparation for partaking in the Holy Communion.

He was one of those responsible for the translation of a revised version of the New Testament.

Pastor
Most of his life was spent in Tranquebar, the little port town that welcomed missionaries Bartholomaeus Ziegenbalg (and Heinrich Plütschau), sent by the King of Denmark in 1706, and Christian Friedrich Schwarz, sponsored at the time by the Danish Missionary Society in Copenhagen.

He was ordained on 31 October 1878 at Tranquebar, by senior J. M. N. Schwartz. From that moment on, he served as pastor in the Lutheran Mission (later known as T.E.L.C.) until his death on 20 May 1927, except for a brief stint with the Missouri Mission, towards the end of his life from 1921 to 1927. The towns and cities where he served are: Tranquebar (1880–1891 and 1897–1919), Karaikal (1897–1919), Manikramam (1919), Porayar (1917–1919), Bangalore (1921), and Madras.

He preached his last sermon on 1st of May 1927, in the Lutheran Adaikalanathar Church, Purasawakam, Madras, on John 10:11–16.

Theologian
His theology was rooted in Lutheran Pietism, a renewed form of the post-reformation Lutheranism that was held by theologians in Halle in the 16th century, such as August Hermann Francke (1663–1727) and Philipp Jakob Spener (1635–1705). He was well versed in the life, works, and teachings of Martin Luther.

He was a great lover of Spurgeon's works, and possessed many of his books in his library. After reading John Ploughman's Talk and John Ploughman's Pictures, he wrote Ullathu Solvayne. Samuel was known as Tamil Spurgeon, although it is not clear if he was known for his strictness in doctrinal matters or for his homiletic gifts. He was also familiar with Waltharian views of Lutheranism. His allegiance was to God first and only then to his church. When it was time for the German missionaries to leave India, leaving the leadership on Indian shoulders, it was decided that the church would follow an Episcopal form of church government. Rev. N. Samuel felt that this and other innovations that were introduced were not according to the Biblical model and protested. When he realised that change was inevitable, in the middle of 1921, he left the T.E.L.C that he had served all his life, and joined the Missouri Mission. He returned to the T.E.L.C. in 1927 shortly before his death.

References

 List of Evangelical Lutheran missionaries in India (1705-19550)
 Arunodayam Issue No. 10 October 1927
 Silver Golden Jubilee Souvenir 1927-1977/1953-1978
The Evangelisch-Lutherisches Missionsblatt 1894
 The Evangelisch-Lutherisches Missionsblatt 1912
 The Gospel Witness Vol VIII February 1913 No. 6
 The Gospel Witness Vol VIII April 1913 No. 8
 The Gospel Witness Vol XXIII September 1927 No. 1
 The Gospel Witness Vol XXIII December 1927 No. 4
 The Gospel Witness Vol LI December 1955 No. 4
 Die Kleine Missionsglocke 1909
 Die Kleine Missionsglocke 1911 Vol XII
 Die Kleine Missionsglocke 1918 Vol XIX
 Die Kleine Missionsglocke 1927 Vol XXVIII
 Evangelisch Lutherischen Mission 1908
 The Lutheran Enterprise in India, edited by C.H.Swavely
 Christian Friedrich Schwartz, Lutheran Missionary to India, 1749–1798 at www.wmcarey.edu

Notes

External links 

Mention of N.Samuel's name in 
Monogram of Gurukul Lutheran Theologican College

Tamil history
Indian Lutheran theologians
Indian Lutherans
Indian evangelicals
1850 births
1927 deaths
Tranquebar